Santanaclupea is an extinct genus of clupeiform fish from the Romualdo Formation (formerly a member of the then Santana Formation, now Santana Group) of Brazil. It is named after Santana do Cariri, the town that the Santana Formation is named after and Clupea, Latin for small river fish. The type species of the genus is Santanaclupea silvasantosi, which was named in honor of Prof. Rubens de Silva Santos.

References 

Clupeiformes
Prehistoric bony fish genera
Cretaceous bony fish
Early Cretaceous animals of South America
Cretaceous Brazil
Fossils of Brazil
Albian life
 
Fossil taxa described in 1993